In organizational theory, dynamic capability is the capability of an organization to purposefully adapt an organization's resource base. The concept was defined by David Teece, Gary Pisano and Amy Shuen, in their 1997 paper Dynamic Capabilities and Strategic Management, as "the firm’s ability to integrate, build, and reconfigure internal and external competences to address rapidly changing environments".

The term is often used in the plural form, dynamic capabilities, emphasizing that the ability to react adequately and timely to external changes requires a combination of multiple capabilities.

Overview 
The phrase "dynamic capabilities" was introduced in a working paper by David Teece, Gary Pisano, and Amy Shuen. The final, peer-reviewed version was published in 1997.

The idea of dynamic capabilities is similar in some ways to the previously existing concept of operational capabilities; the latter pertains to the current operations of an organization, whereas the former, by contrast, refers to an organization's capacity to efficiently and responsively change these operations and develop its resources.

The main assumption of this framework is that an organization's basic competencies should be used to create short-term competitive positions that can be developed into longer-term competitive advantage. Nelson and Winter, in their 1982 book An Evolutionary Theory of Economic Change, link the growth of the concept of dynamic capabilities to the resource-based view of the firm and  the concept of "routines" in evolutionary theories of organization. Douma and Scheuder describe it as a bridge between the economics-based strategy literature and evolutionary approaches to organizations.

The resource-based view of the firm emphasizes sustainable competitive advantage; the dynamic capabilities view, on the other hand, focuses more on the issue of competitive survival in response to rapidly changing contemporary business conditions.  Strategy scholars Gregory Ludwig and Jon Pemberton, in one of the few empirical studies on the topic, called for clarification of the specific processes of dynamic capability building in particular industries to make the concept more useful to senior managers who set directions for their firms.

Dynamic capabilities theory concerns the development of strategies for senior managers of successful companies to adapt to radical discontinuous change, while maintaining minimum capability standards to ensure competitive survival.  For example, industries which have traditionally relied on a specific manufacturing process can't always change this process on short notice when a new technology arrives; when this happens, managers need to adapt their own routines to make the most of their existing resources while simultaneously planning for future process changes  as the resources depreciate. Similarly, the kind of changes that the theory is emphasizing are the internal capabilities rather than only looking into the external business forces.

The New Dynamic Capabilities framework, posed by Amy Shuen in her analysis of Web 2.0, focuses on the firm's ability to quickly orchestrate and reconfigure externally sourced competences, ranging from Apple, Google Android, IBM Linux developer ecosystems to crowdsourced, crowdfunded open innovations such as the Obama08 mobile app—while leveraging internal resources such as platforms, know-how, user communities and digital, social and mobile networks. The New Dynamic Capabilities framework takes into account digital, information and network economics and the fall of the transaction costs of involved in using specialized services. According to Philip Cordes-Berszinn and Basiouni, though, more research is needed in order to measure the "capabilities" and to appropriately apply the ideas to practical management situations.

Many scholars have argued that the dynamic capability theory is vague and tautological. This is a critical issue, and while the theory remains very helpful when addressing how to respond to the business changing environment, it may fail to describe exactly how. Further, Lawson and Samson  suggest that the capabilities of the theory are difficult to identify and/or operationalize, and in some cases, those very capabilities can lead to a core capability becoming core rigidity. As such, the use of the theory in its current state is difficult without being able to further specify, develop, and identify those capabilities.

Wheeler  Zahra et al. proposed an operationalization of the dynamic capabilities and to be further tested across different settings and countries. To further clarify concepts related to the dynamic capability and absorptive capacity theories, Wheeler introduced an application derived from the dynamic capability theory for net-enablement. Wheeler's Net-Enabled Business Innovation Cycle facilitates understanding and predicting how firms transform dynamic capabilities associated with net-enablement into customer value using the dynamic capability theory. These net-enabled firms are able to “continually reconfigure their internal and external resources to employ digital networks to exploit business opportunities” through their “routines, knowledge, analysis and rules to create customer value from their net-enablement capability” (p. 128). Accordingly, and based on Wheeler's NEBIC model, Williams  have qualitatively developed instruments to measure the dynamic capabilities and Basiouni   developed the measurements quantitatively and tested them on many settings and in different countries such as Canada and Saudi Arabia.

Processes 
A detailed description of processes and theoretical roots is provided by Arndt, Pierce, and Teece (2017). Teece, Pisano, and Shuen proposed three dynamic capabilities as necessary for an organization to meet new challenges:  the ability of employees to learn quickly and to build new strategic assets; the integration of these new strategic assets, including capability, technology and customer feedback, into company processes; and lastly the transformation or reuse of existing assets which have depreciated.  Teece refers to successful implementation of these three stages as developing "corporate agility".

Learning
The first stage, learning, requires employees and managers to reorganize their routines to promote interactions that lead to successful solutions to particular problems, to recognize and avoid dysfunctional activity and  strategic blind spots, and to make appropriate use of alliance and acquisition to bring new strategic assets into the firm from external sources. A practical example of this is provided by Jean-Pierre Jeannet and Hein Schreuder, in their book From Coal to Biotech, which lays out how the Dutch company DSM transformed itself twice using 'strategic learning cycles'.

New assets 
In his 1988 book Managing Quality, David A. Garvin states that quality performance depends on organisational routines for gathering and processing information, for linking customer experiences with engineering design choices and for coordinating factories and component suppliers. Increasingly competitive advantage also requires the integration of external activities and technologies through alliances and partnerships.

Transformation of existing assets 
Economists Amit and Schoemaker pointed out in 1993 that success in fast changing markets depends on reconfiguring the firm's asset structure to accomplish rapid internal and external transformation. Firms must develop processes to make changes inexpensively while accomplishing reconfiguration and transformation ahead of the competition. This can be supported by decentralization, local autonomy and strategic alliances.

Co-specialization 
Another "dynamic capabilities" concept is co-specialization. For example, the physical assets, human resources and the intellectual property of a company, having developed together over time, are more valuable in combination than separately, and give a firm a sustainable competitive advantage.

Distinction between dynamic capabilities and ordinary capabilities 
Dynamic capabilities are closely related to the concept of ordinary capabilities as they both are organizational capabilities, yet both are distinct in nature. The resource-based view of the firm and the dynamic capabilities view (DCV) have focused on two broad categories of organizational capabilities that are essential for firm performance: zero-order ordinary capabilities needed to exploit a firm's current strategic assets through day-to-day operations (Winter, 2003) and higher-order dynamic capabilities required to alter a firm's resource base by integrating, building, and reconfiguring competences (Eisenhardt & Martin, 2000; Teece et al., 1997). Qaiyum and Wang (2018)  show that ordinary and dynamic capabilities are needed in different contexts.

See also
 Corporate foresight
 Resource-based view
 Theory of the firm

References

Further reading
  
 
 
 Najda-Janoszka, Marta (2016). Dynamic capability-based approach to value appropriation. Krakow: Jagiellonian University Press.
 Basiouni, A (2018). A Multi-Group Analysis of Innovation in Online Business Models. PERTANIKA Journal of Social Science and Humanities (JSSH), 26(T), 51–62.
 

Management
Organizational theory